Basanta Das is an Indian National Congress politician from Assam. He has been elected to Assam Legislative Assembly from Mangaldoi constituency.

References 

Year of birth missing
Possibly living people
Indian National Congress politicians from Assam
Assam MLAs 2021–2026
Assam MLAs 2001–2006
Assam MLAs 2011–2016